is a Japanese former track cyclist who won silver medals in the sprint competition at the 1986 and 1987 UCI Track Cycling World Championships, in addition to a bronze medal in the same event in 1989. He was also a professional keirin cyclist with over 400 wins.

References

External links

1964 births
Living people
Japanese male cyclists
Sportspeople from Aichi Prefecture
Japanese track cyclists
People from Toyokawa, Aichi